José Marti Ceda Marte (born January 28, 1987) is a Dominican former Major League Baseball player. He played in MLB for the Florida Marlins in 2010 and 2011.

Professional career
Ceda started his career in the San Diego Padres organization. In , Ceda, a right-handed pitcher, had a record of 4 wins and 2 losses in 13 games for the Padres' Dominican Summer League team, while posting a 1.50 ERA. He was traded by the Padres to the Chicago Cubs for Todd Walker on July 31, .

On November 13, Ceda was traded by the Cubs to the Florida Marlins in exchange for right-handed pitcher Kevin Gregg.  He was added to the Marlins' 40 man roster following the 2009 season to protect him from the Rule 5 draft.

On August 14, 2011, Ceda gained some infamy by walking relief pitcher Santiago Casilla on four pitches when Casilla was standing at the outermost point of the batter's box, clearly not intending to swing at any pitches.

On April 14, 2012, Ceda underwent Tommy John surgery and spent the rest of the 2012 season on the disabled list.

Ceda was outrighted off the Marlins roster on October 4, 2013. He elected free agency on November 4, 2013.

References

External links

1987 births
Living people
Arizona League Cubs players
Arizona League Padres players
Boise Hawks players
Daytona Cubs players
Dominican Republic expatriate baseball players in the United States
Florida Marlins players
Greensboro Grasshoppers players
Jacksonville Suns players

Major League Baseball pitchers
Major League Baseball players from the Dominican Republic
Peoria Chiefs players
Tennessee Smokies players